Koyote, also known as KYT is a South Korean co-ed vocal group consisting of members Kim Jong-min, Shin Ji, and Bbaek Ga. The group, which is known for its signature dance and hip hop sound, debuted in 1998 with hit song "Genuine".

Since its debut, Koyote has released ten studio albums, three extended plays, and numerous singles. The group has won several major awards including five Bonsangs at the Golden Disc Awards, four awards for Best Mixed Group at the Mnet Asian Music Awards, and the Grand Prize at the 2005 KBS Music Awards.

The group has gone through numerous line-up changes over the years, and Shin Ji is the group's only remaining original member.

History 
Prior to debut, member Cha Seung Min had been an actor, starring in a show called Push!Push!. With Shin Ji, and Kim Goo, they formed Koyote as a 3 member Co-ed group

1999–2002: Departure of Cha Seung-min, arrest of Kim Goo, and new line-up changes 
Koyote's first album, "고요태(高耀太)", received positive reviews among its release, and they instantly became well known for their song "Pure Love." They also promoted "Meeting", which was a remake of Im Ki-Hoon's 1995 song, in later 1999. They released their second album, "실연" (also the same name with their title track) in October 1999. Their title track reached up to first place nominee on various music programs, but was blocked off by Steve Yoo. Right after their promotions for "미련" ended, Cha Seung-min left the group to "focus on his studies". The truth is that he was the son of their company's CEO, X-PLUS Media. As he had arguments constantly with his father, he was forced to leave and Koyote eventually had no agency, and were on the verge of disbandment. Composer Joo Young-hoon eventually knew their situation and helped them find a new agency. In November 2000, their song "Passion" became a hit, with their popularity beginning to rise up even further. As Cha Seung-min left the group, Kim Jong-min replaced him as a temporary serve vocalist. They promoted "Disturbance" in January 2001, with various remixes. The song eventually rose up to first place nominee on Music Bank and consecutively won for 2 weeks. They also promoted "Pride" for a week. Right after their promotions ended, Kim Jong-min left the group. He returned in October and became a regular member. In 2002, Kim Goo was arrested during the shooting of one of their videos due to drug use, and was replaced by Kim Young-wan.

2004–present: Bbaek Ga's surgery, Enlistment of Kim Jong-min, and Departure of Jung Myung-hoon 
In 2004, Jung Myung-hoon left the group to fulfill his mandatory military service, and was replaced by Bbaek Ga. They released Feel Up Doeda, which won the South Korean Daesang for best artist. In 2007, they went on hiatus due to Kim Jong-min and Bbaek Ga needing to fulfill their military services. They returned with 2 members, Kim Jong-min and Shin Ji, with Bbaek Ga being absent due to a brain tumor. They released their 10th studio album Jumpin, with their lead Single "Return"
Between 2010 and 2011, Koyote began to release EPs. Their EPs garnered mixed reviews, with Koyote beginning to release non album singles prior to the reviews. In 2015, their single "Stop love" Peaked at number 99 on the Gaon Chart, making that their first single to appear on the chart. Between 2016–2018, they hinted at a possible album in 2019, with 2 songs recorded in 2018. After, they went on hiatus until 2019, when their album "Reborn" was released.

Members

Current members 

Kim Jong-min (김종민) joined in 2000
Shin Ji (신지)  original member
 (빽가) joined in 2004

Former members 
  (차승민) – left in 2000
  (김구) – kicked out in 2002
  (김영완) – temporary rapper in 2002
  (정명훈) – temporary rapper in 2003

Discography

Studio albums

Compilation albums

Remix albums

EPs

Singles

Other charted songs

Collaborations 
 코요테 & NRG의 神나는 X-Mas (2 CD), 2001.12 (with N.R.G.)

Ambassadorship 
 Public relations ambassador Korea Youth Federation (2023)

Awards and nominations

Notes

References 

K-pop music groups
South Korean dance music groups
South Korean idol groups
Musical groups established in 1998
1998 establishments in South Korea
MAMA Award winners
South Korean Eurodance groups
South Korean co-ed groups